Third Rail is a Singaporean English-language drama produced by Ochre Pictures and distributed by Mediacorp. The first two episodes premiered on MeWATCH on 17 October 2022, with two new episodes added every Monday. The series began airing on Mediacorp's YouTube drama channel and Channel 5 on 25 and 31 October 2022, respectively.

Cast

Main Cast

Production 
The set of Third Rail was housed inside one of Changi Exhibition Centre's hall, which featured two decommissioned Kawasaki Heavy Industries C151 MRT train carriages (Carriage no. 3095 and 1095 of 095/096) and a specially constructed railway tunnel. The set was also one of the biggest to be built in Singapore.

References 

Singaporean drama television series
English-language television shows
2022 Singaporean television series debuts
2022 Singaporean television series endings
Channel 5 (Singapore) original programming